José Tomas Uruñuela (Gasteiz, 28 July 1891 – Donostia, 3 July 1963) was a Basque composer. He was also a master of danza alavés.

References

Basque composers
1891 births
1963 deaths
20th-century composers
People from Vitoria-Gasteiz
Spanish musicologists
20th-century Spanish musicians
20th-century musicologists